WAML may refer to:

 WAML (AM), a radio station (1340 AM) licensed to Laurel, Mississippi, United States
 The ICAO code for Mutiara Airport in Palu, Central Sulawesi, Indonesia
 West Anglia Main Line, a railway line in the United Kingdom
 World Association for Medical Law, an international not-for-profit organization focusing on health law, legal medicine and bioethics
 Western Association of Map Libraries, a North American library association.